Clark Dean (born 3 February 2000) is an American rower. He is an Olympian and twice world champion at junior level at the World Rowing Junior Championships.

Biography

After winning three medals at the junior rowing world championships, two of which gold, in 2019, Dean made his senior debut with the US national team at just 19 years of age, obtaining a fifth place in the final of coxless four at the 2019 World Rowing Championships.

Achievements

Awards
In 2018 Dean won the US Rowing award U19 Male Athlete of the Year.

References

External links
 

2000 births
Living people
American male rowers
Rowers at the 2020 Summer Olympics
Olympic rowers of the United States
Sportspeople from Sarasota, Florida
Harvard Crimson rowers
21st-century American people